Ju Jeung-ryu (February 11, 1926 – 1980) was South Korean actress whose fame peaked in the 1950s and 1960s. She starred in about 400 films. Ju was born in Yonghung, Hamkyongnam-do, nowadays in North Korea. While attending Hamnam Girls' High School, Ju became an ardent play fan. When she became eighteen, she ran away from home and joined in the theater company, Gohyeop. Her first role as an actress was a maid in Muyeongtap (무영탑) written by Yu Chi-jin.

Filmography 
*Note; the whole list is referenced.

Producer

Awards 
 1967 6th Grand Bell Awards : Best Supporting Actress for Full Ship (Manseon)

See also
Cinema of Korea

References

External links 

1926 births
1980 deaths
South Korean film actresses
South Korean television actresses
20th-century South Korean actresses